Gary Allan Anderson (born 16 July 1959) is a South African former American football placekicker who played in the National Football League (NFL) for 23 seasons. The first South African to appear in an NFL regular season game, he spent the majority of his career with the Pittsburgh Steelers and is also known for his tenure with the Minnesota Vikings. Anderson earned four Pro Bowl and two first-team All-Pro honors after joining the league in 1982 and was named to the NFL's second All-Decade teams of the 1980s and 1990s, as well as the Steelers All-Time Team. He is one of 29 individuals to be selected to multiple All-Decade teams.

With the Vikings in 1998, Anderson became the first NFL kicker to convert every field goal and extra point in the regular season. During the postseason, however, he missed a critical field goal in the 1998 NFC Championship Game, which is regarded as a primary factor for the Vikings' subsequent defeat. Anderson continued his NFL career for six more seasons until retiring in 2004. He ranks third in games played (353), points scored (2,434), and field goals made (538) and is also the Steelers' all-time leading scorer at 1,343 points.

Early life
Gary Anderson was born in Parys, South Africa and grew up in Durban. His father, the Reverend Douglas Anderson, played professional soccer in England. His mother was South African.  Shortly after Gary graduated from high school at Brettonwood High, Reverend Anderson left South Africa and moved his family to the United States.

Gary Anderson had hoped to follow in his father's footsteps and become a professional soccer player in Europe. On his third day after immigrating to the United States, Gary Anderson had been given a few American footballs to kick. He went to a local high school football field in Downingtown, Pennsylvania to see what kicking this type of ball was like. Gary Anderson grew up playing rugby and was drop-kicking them from the 50-yard line. A high school football coach and friend of Dick Vermeil watched Gary Anderson and arranged a tryout with the Philadelphia Eagles the next day. Gary Anderson was aged only 18, having just graduated high school, so at the tryout there were university scouts present, all four of whom offered scholarships to Gary Anderson on the spot. Anderson chose Syracuse after they promised him that he would also be able to play on the school's soccer team. He played for the Syracuse soccer team in 1978 and 1979, scoring nineteen goals, before devoting himself to football his junior and senior seasons.

Professional career

After graduating from Syracuse University, he was drafted as a placekicker by the Buffalo Bills in the 1982 NFL Draft but was cut before the season began. He then, within a few days, signed as a free agent with the Pittsburgh Steelers and spent the following 13 seasons in Pittsburgh. For the 1995 and 1996 seasons, Anderson signed as a free agent with the Philadelphia Eagles. He then spent the 1997 season as a member of the San Francisco 49ers.

He also had the distinction of wearing a one-bar facemask throughout his career, even though the NFL outlawed their use prior to his final season in 2004 – he, along with Arizona Cardinals punter Scott Player, were afforded a grandfather clause.

In 1998, Anderson signed with the Minnesota Vikings and converted all 35 of his attempted field goals and all 59 extra points in regular season play, becoming the first placekicker to finish the regular season with a 100% success rate on both field goals and extra points.  His only miss of the season came in the 1998 NFC Championship Game against the Atlanta Falcons. The Falcons ending up winning the game in overtime sending them to Super Bowl XXXIII. Anderson continued to play for the Vikings until 2002. In 2000, while with the Vikings, Anderson surpassed the legendary George Blanda to become the NFL's All-Time Leading Scorer and held the record upon his retirement from the NFL in 2004. Anderson played his final two seasons with the Tennessee Titans in the 2003 and 2004 seasons. Anderson played 23 years in the NFL; only Adam Vinatieri (24 seasons), Morten Andersen (25 seasons) and George Blanda (26 seasons) have had longer playing tenures; Additionally, Vinatieri and Andersen are the only players to play in more career games than Anderson. Although not officially retired, Anderson's number 1 has also not been reissued by Steelers since his departure from the team.

There are a number of interesting coincidences between Anderson and Morten Andersen, another retired star placekicker.  Anderson and Andersen have nearly identical last names, were born within a year of one another outside the United States (Andersen was born in Denmark), came to the United States as teenagers, had long and successful NFL careers throughout the 1980s and 1990s (and both retiring in the 2000s decade), and hold first or second place in a number of NFL records for scoring, field goals, and longevity. Their overall accuracy is also nearly identical; their career percentage being within .5% of each other on both FGs and PATs. In the 1998 NFC Championship Game, Anderson missed a field goal for the Minnesota Vikings before Andersen successfully converted his winning kick for the Atlanta Falcons (which sent them to Super Bowl XXXIII, their first Super Bowl appearance), both from the same distance as well (38 yards). On 16 December 2006, Andersen passed Anderson to become the all-time leading scorer in NFL history. The following weekend, 24 December 2006, Andersen again passed Anderson to become the NFL's career leader in field goals made.

Career regular season statistics

Career high/best bolded

NFL records

Single season

Held record for Points in a single season with no touchdowns scored: 1998 (164 points, 59 PATs, 35 FGs)(broken by David Akers in 2011)
 Field goal percentage: 1998 (100%, 35/35)

Career

 Points: 3rd place, 2,434 Held record from 2000 (passing George Blanda) until 2006 (passed by Morten Andersen).
 FG made: 3rd place, 538.
 Extra points made: 4th place, 820.
 Games: 3rd place, 353.
 Points as a Pittsburgh Steeler: 1,343

Retirement

Anderson stayed with the Vikings until the 2002 season, then he joined the Tennessee Titans as a replacement for the injured Joe Nedney.  Anderson connected on 27 of 31 field goal attempts in the regular season despite rotating periodically with punter Craig Hentrich, who booted four of five FGAs.  In Tennessee's playoff win over Baltimore, Anderson connected on the winning 46-yard field goal in the final seconds, while in Tennessee's playoff loss to New England he missed on his one attempt.

After that season, Anderson was making plans to retire and turned down offers from several teams to come kick for them.  In June 2004, Anderson, his wife, Kay, and sons Austin and Douglas moved to the Canadian Rocky Mountain town of Canmore, Alberta, Canada, just outside Banff National Park. When Nedney went down with another season-ending injury after the start of the 2004 season, Anderson again agreed to kick for the Titans, commuting from Canada each week. At the time of his retirement, Anderson was the last active player in the NFL to have played under former Steelers head coach Chuck Noll and the last remaining NFL player born in the 1950s. Anderson's son Austin began his university career in the fall of 2008 as a freshman at McGill University in Montreal, Quebec, becoming the starting placekicker for the McGill Redmen football team until his graduation in April 2012.

Gary, and his wife, Kay, give back to their community by hosting an annual charity fundraiser called, "Dreams for Teams" in Canmore, Alberta with the mission of making a positive difference in the lives of Bow Valley school athletes, primarily through providing financial support, to assist them in becoming leaders, valuing teamwork, and achieving athletic and academic excellence.  Anderson also coaches the local boys high school soccer team in Canmore. Anderson is passionate about fly fishing, and is a spokesman for the fly fishing industry.

See also

 List of most consecutive starts and games played by National Football League players
 1998 NFC Championship Game

References

External links

 
Anderson misses, Andersen makes it
Gary Anderson – The Pro Football Archives

1959 births
Living people
People from Parys
American Conference Pro Bowl players
American football placekickers
American soccer players
Minnesota Vikings players
National Conference Pro Bowl players
Philadelphia Eagles players
Pittsburgh Steelers players
San Francisco 49ers players
South African players of American football
South African emigrants to Canada
South African emigrants to the United States
White South African people
South African people of English descent
Syracuse Orange football players
Syracuse Orange men's soccer players
Tennessee Titans players
Association football forwards
Rugby union players that played in the NFL
Ed Block Courage Award recipients